
The following is a list of Playboy Playmates of 1987.  Playboy magazine names its Playmate of the Month each month throughout the year.

January

Luann Laureen Lee (born January 28, 1961) is an American model, singer and actress. Luann was selected as Playboy magazine's Playmate of the Month in January 1987. Luann has appeared in several Playboy videos and special editions, working steadily for Playboy for more than five years following her centerfold appearance. Lee also appeared in an episode of Married... with Children.

February

Julie Peterson (born September 29, 1964) is an American model. She was chosen as Playboys Playmate of the Month in February 1987. She is also a member of Mensa and a 1986 graduate of Life Chiropractic College. From 2001 to 2005 she hosted a CNN syndicated show called Health Watch. She is a chiropractor in Charleston SC, where she hosted "The Wellness Revolution" on local radio.

March

Marina Augusta Pepper (born December 8, 1967, in Windsor, Berkshire, England; née Baker)  is an English liberal democrat local politician, journalist, children's book author and former model and actress.  She was chosen as Playboy's Playmate of the Month for March 1987.

April

Anna Clark (born October 19, 1966, in San Francisco, California) is an American model and actress. She was chosen as Playboy's Playmate of the month for April 1987.

May

Kymberly Paige (born April 6, 1966, in Newport Beach, California) is an American model and actress. She was chosen as Playboy's Playmate of the month for May 1987.

June

Sandy Elizabeth Greenberg (also known as Sondra Greenberg) (born  July 22, 1958, in Spokane, Washington) is an American model and actress. She was chosen as Playboy's Playmate of the Month for June 1987. She lived in St. Louis, Missouri when she became Playmate of the Month. She was also featured in a "Maxine Legroom" pictorial in January of that year, a parody of TV's Max Headroom.

July

Carmen Berg (born August 17, 1963) is an American model and actress. She was chosen as Playboy's Playmate of the Month for July 1987. She is currently a real estate agent in Southern California.

August

Sharry Konopski (born December 2, 1967, in Longview, Washington – August 25, 2017) was an American model and actress. She was chosen as Playboys Playmate of the Month for August 1987 and appeared in numerous Playboy videos.

September

Gwen Hajek (born November 18, 1966, in Shreveport, Louisiana) is an American model and actress. She was chosen as Playboys Playmate of the Month for September 1987.

October

Brandi Brandt (born November 2, 1968, in Santa Clara, California) is an American model and actress, who was Playboy's Playmate of the Month for October 1987.  She was the cover model for the August 1989 issue of Playboy and shared the cover of the March 1990 issue with Donald Trump.

Brandt was married to Mötley Crüe bassist Nikki Sixx, with whom she had three children.

November

Pamela Jean Stein (or Pam Stein) (born August 13, 1963, in Syracuse, New York) is an American model and actress. She was chosen as Playboy magazine's Playmate of the Month for its November 1987 issue. Her Playboy centerfold is featured in the movie Die Hard, and used as a point of reference by John McLean as he navigates from the elevator shaft to the ventilation shaft. She is married to Robin Zander, the frontman of American power pop band, Cheap Trick.

December

India Allen (born June 1, 1965; Portsmouth, Virginia) is an American actress and model. Allen appeared as a centerfold in the December 1987 issue of Playboy magazine and was subsequently named Playmate of the Year in 1988. In 1996, Allen was a witness in the civil trial of O. J. Simpson.

See also
 List of people in Playboy 1980–1989

References

1987-related lists
1987
Playmates Of 1987